Phoxichilidiidae is a family of sea spiders. About 150 species are described, almost all in the genus Anoplodactylus Wilson, 1878.

References

 PycnoBase: World list of Pycnogonida

Pycnogonids
Chelicerate families